Kara-Bulung is a village in At-Bashy District of Naryn Region of Kyrgyzstan. Its population was 1,917 in 2021. European route E125 passes through the village.

References
 

Populated places in Naryn Region